The COVID-19 pandemic in Norfolk Island is part of the ongoing worldwide pandemic of coronavirus disease 2019 (COVID-19) caused by severe acute respiratory syndrome coronavirus 2 (SARS-CoV-2). The virus was confirmed to have reached Norfolk Island on December 30, 2021.

Background
On 12 January 2020, the World Health Organization (WHO) confirmed that a novel coronavirus was the cause of a respiratory illness in a cluster of people in Wuhan City, Hubei Province, China, which was reported to the WHO on 31 December 2019.

The case fatality ratio for COVID-19 has been much lower than SARS of 2003, but the transmission has been significantly greater, with a significant total death toll.

Timeline

March 2020

In March 2020, as a precautionary measure, the Norfolk Island Regional Council imposed a 32-day travel ban and declared a state of emergency. Administrator Eric Hutchinson stated that the measures were necessary due to the remote island's extremely limited health capacity.

May 2020
Lockdown measures began to be lifted from 6 May 2020.

August 2021
Following outbreaks in the Australian Eastern States and Territories in mid-2021, Norfolk islands implemented further restrictions. COVID-19 support packages were made available for Norfolk Island businesses and residents.

December 2021
COVID-19 was confirmed to have reached Norfolk Island on December 30, 2021.

January 2022
Cases continued to spread in January 2022. As of January 26, 2022, 75 cases have been confirmed, with only one recovered. The cases were confirmed to be the Omicron variant of the virus.

Vaccination
Vaccinations started in August 2021. As of January 8, 2022, 2002 residents have received their first dose, 1720 have received their second, and 411 have received a booster shot.

See also
 COVID-19 pandemic in Oceania

References

 
Norfolk Island
2020 in Norfolk Island
2021 in Norfolk Island
2022 in Norfolk Island
Norfolk Island
Norfolk Island